B.L.E.V.E. is the debut studio album by Kansas City rapper Kutt Calhoun, released on August 10, 2004 through the label Strange Music. Among the featured artists beyond Calhoun were Krizz Kaliko, Tech N9ne, and Skatterman & Snug Brim. Rap Reviews greeted the album positively, giving it a score of 7/10 and writing "Calhoun has represented his hometown [Kansas City] admirably on B.L.E.V.E. and seems on the verge of blowing up bigtime. All he needs is more exposure, a slightly tighter selection of beats, and one big video on a Viacom owned network."

Track listing

References

Kutt Calhoun albums
2004 debut albums
Strange Music albums